Allotinus nicholsi is a butterfly in the family Lycaenidae. It was described by Moulton in 1912. It is found on Borneo and Sumatra.

Subspecies
Allotinus nicholsi nicholsi (Borneo: Sarawak)
Allotinus nicholsi battakanus Fruhstorfer, 1913 (Sumatra: Battak Mountains)

References

Butterflies described in 1912
Allotinus
Butterflies of Borneo